The amphisbaena (or , plural: amphisbaenae) is a mythological, ant-eating serpent with a head at each end. The creature is alternatively called the amphisbaina, amphisbene, amphisboena, amphisbona, amphista, amfivena, amphivena, or anphivena (the last two being feminine), and is also known as the "Mother of Ants".

Mythology
According to Greek mythology, the amphisbaena was spawned from the blood that dripped from the Gorgon Medusa's head as Perseus flew over the Libyan Desert with her head in his hand, after which Cato's army then encountered it along with other serpents on the march. Amphisbaena fed on the corpses left behind. The amphisbaena has been referred to by various poets such as Nicander, John Milton, Alexander Pope, Percy Bysshe Shelley, Alfred Tennyson, Aimé Césaire, A. E. Housman and Allen Mandelbaum; as a mythological and legendary creature, it has been referenced by Lucan, Pliny the Elder, Isidore of Seville, and Thomas Browne , the last of whom debunked its existence ( book three chapter XV).

Appearance 

These early descriptions of the amphisbaena depict a venomous, dual-headed snakelike creature. However, medieval and later drawings often show it with two or more scaled feet, particularly chicken feet, and feathered wings. Some even depict it as a horned, dragon-like creature with a serpent-headed tail and small, round ears, while others have both "necks" of equal size so that it cannot be determined which is the rear head. Many descriptions of the amphisbaena say its eyes glow like candles or lightning, but the poet Nicander seems to contradict this by describing it as "always dull of eye". He also says: "From either end protrudes a blunt chin; each is far from each other." Nicander's account seems to be referring to what is indeed called the Amphisbaenia, a group of real lizards.

Habitat 

The amphisbaena is said to make its home in the desert.

Folk medicine 
In ancient times, the supposedly dangerous amphisbaena had many uses in the art of folk medicine and other such remedies. Pliny notes that expecting women wearing a live amphisbaena around their necks would have safe pregnancies; however, if one's goal was to cure ailments such as arthritis or the common cold, one should wear only its skin. By eating the meat of the amphisbaena, one could supposedly attract many lovers of the opposite sex, and slaying one during the full moon could give power to one who is pure of heart and mind. Lumberjacks suffering from cold weather on the job could nail its carcass or skin to a tree to keep warm, while in the process allowing the tree to be felled more easily.

Origins 

In The Book of Beasts, T.H. White suggests that the creature derives from sightings of the worm lizards of the same name. These creatures are found in the Mediterranean countries where many of these legends originated.

The Códice Casanatense, a Portuguese book describing the areas the Portuguese had visited, includes an illustration of the flora and fauna of India. One of the animals shown is a two-headed snake, with one head on each end, much like an amphisbaena. The image is captioned, "two headed snakes of India are harmless". It is possible a sighting of an animal like this was the origin of the amphisbaena.

In media 
In John Milton's Paradise Lost, after the Fall and the return of Satan to Hell, some of the fallen angelic host are transformed into the amphisbaena, to represent the animal by which the Fall was caused, i.e. a snake.

Amphisbaena appears in some editions of the tabletop roleplaying game Dungeons & Dragons.

Amphisbaena has appeared in several video games as an enemy or boss monster, including La-Mulana and Bravely Second: End Layer. A creature called Amphisbaena appears in the games Castlevania: Symphony of the Night and Portrait of Ruin but bears little resemblance to other renditions of the creature, appearing as an eyeless 4-legged reptile with the upper body of a human woman sprouting from its long tail instead of a double-headed serpent.

In the 1984 animated film Gallavants, an amphisbaena (called a 'Vanterviper' in the film) appears as a minor antagonist. The two heads, a red one named Edil and a blue one called Fice, frequently disagree and argue, and sing a song about their miserable plight.

The amphisbaena is mentioned in The Last Wish, from The Witcher series by Andrzej Sapkowski, while protagonist Geralt of Rivia recalls past events. The amphisbaena was endangering the region of Kovir until the beast was slain by Geralt's hand.

Amphisbaena is referenced in RWBY, an animated web series created by Monty Oum, in the form of an evil creature called Grimm. Of the different Grimm, the amphisbaena appears to be the King Taijitu, a two-headed snake or serpent. The king's name references the taijitu, a symbol or diagram in Chinese philosophy representing Taiji in both its monist and dualist aspects. The Grimm's coloration visually symbolizes the taijitu, with one head and body section black and the opposite side white.

The amphisbaena appears in the Rise of the Teenage Mutant Ninja Turtles episode "Battle Nexus: New York." This version is one of the known champions of the Battle Nexus. Big Mama had Michelangelo and Meat Sweats compete to feed each of its heads in order to satisfy the amphisbaena. They managed to work together to pull it off.

Brandon Sanderson's novel Skyward has a character whose name is Arturo Mendez. His call sign is amphisbaena.

See also 
 Amphisbaenia
 Polycephaly
 Ouroboros
 Double-headed serpent
 Pushmi-Pullyu

References

Bibliography 
 Hunt, Jonathan (1998). Bestiary: An Illuminated Alphabet of Medieval Beasts (1st ed.). Hong Kong: Simon & Schuster. .
 Levy, Sidney J. (1996). "Stalking the Amphisbaena", Journal of Consumer Research, 23 (3), Dec. 1996, pp. 163–176.

External links 

 Theoi Greek Mythology : Amphisbaena

Greek legendary creatures
Legendary serpents
Mythical many-headed creatures
Medusa